Fuxin Mongol Autonomous County, or simply Fuxin County, is a county in the west of Liaoning of Northeast China. It is under the administration of Fuxin City.

Administrative Divisions
There are 13 towns and 22 townships in the county.

Towns:
Shijiazi, Yusi, Daba, Wangfu, Dongliang, Jiumiao, Wuhuanchi, Tabenzhalan, Yimatu, Fosi, Paozi, Jianshe, Furong

Townships:
Qijiazi Township, Bajiazi Township, Shiwujiazi Township, Daban Township, Daguben Township, Taiping Township, Zhalanyingzi Township, Huashige Township, Ping'andi Township, Laohetu Township, Hongmaozi Township, Cangtu Township, Shala Township, Zhaoshugou Township, Guohua Township, Wofenggou Township, Hadahushao Township, Zidutai Township, Tayingzi Township, Xinmin Township, Fuxingdi Township, Zhizhushan Township

References

External links

 
County-level divisions of Liaoning
Mongol autonomous counties